"Ultraviolet" is a single by English drum and bass record production duo Fred V & Grafix. It was released on 18 March 2016 as the lead single from their second studio album, Oxygen (2016). "Ultraviolet" features vocals from Bristol-based singer-songwriter Chelsea Watts. The B-side track "Comb Funk" features vocal samples from singer Shannon Kitchen. Both tracks have been played on BBC Radio 1 and 1Xtra by British DJs MistaJam and Friction.

Track listing

Release history

Personnel 
 Fred Vahrman – producer, writer
 Josh "Grafix" Jackson – producer, writer
 Chelsea Watts – vocals ("Ultraviolet")
 Shannon Kitchen – vocals ("Comb Funk")
 Lewis Hopkin – mastering
 Songs in the Key of Knife – publishing
 Ricky Trickartt – artwork

References

External links
Lyrics of this song at Musixmatch

2016 singles
2016 songs
Fred V & Grafix songs
Hospital Records singles